Inga Medvedeva (born 27 January 1979) is a Russian alpine skier and Paralympic medalist.

Life 
She won a bronze medal at the 2002 Winter Paralympics, and two silver medals at the 2014 Winter Paralympics.

References

External links 

 https://www.paralympic.org/asp/lib/TheASP.asp?pageid=8937&sportid=564&personid=912855&WinterGames=-1
 https://www.paralympic.org/video/inga-medvedeva-and-valery-redkozubov-talk-about-home-games

Alpine skiers at the 2014 Winter Paralympics
Alpine skiers at the 2002 Winter Paralympics
Russian female alpine skiers
Living people
Medalists at the 2014 Winter Paralympics
Medalists at the 2002 Winter Paralympics
Paralympic alpine skiers of Russia
1994 births
Place of birth missing (living people)
Paralympic medalists in alpine skiing
Paralympic silver medalists for Russia
Paralympic bronze medalists for Russia
1979 births
20th-century Russian women
21st-century Russian women